The Congressional Gold Medal is an award bestowed by the United States Congress. It is Congress's highest expression of national appreciation for distinguished achievements and contributions by individuals or institutions. The congressional practice of issuing gold medals to occasionally honor recipients from the military began during the American Revolution. Later the practice extended to individuals in all walks of life and in the late 20th century also to groups. The Congressional Gold Medal and the Presidential Medal of Freedom are the highest civilian awards in the United States. The congressional medal seeks to honor those, individually or as a group, "who have performed an achievement that has an impact on American history and culture that is likely to be recognized as a major achievement in the recipient's field long after the achievement." However, "There are no permanent statutory provisions specifically relating to the creation of Congressional Gold Medals. When a Congressional Gold Medal has been deemed appropriate, Congress has, by legislative action, provided for the creation of a medal on an ad hoc basis." Thus, there are generally fewer gold medals than presidential medals. U.S. citizenship is not a requirement.

, 173 institutions, people, or events have been awarded a Congressional Gold Medal.

History

Since the American Revolution, Congress has commissioned gold medals as its highest expression of national appreciation for distinguished achievements and contributions. The medal was first awarded in 1776 by the Second Continental Congress to General George Washington. Although the first recipients were military figures who participated in the American Revolution, the War of 1812 and the Mexican–American War, Congress broadened the scope of the medal to include actors, authors, entertainers, musicians, pioneers in aeronautics and space, explorers, lifesavers, notables in science and medicine, athletes, humanitarians, public servants, and foreign recipients. The medal is normally awarded to persons, but in 1979 the American Red Cross became the first organization to be honored with a gold medal.

, four people had been awarded more than one gold medal: Winfield Scott (1814 for the War of 1812 and 1848 for the Mexican–American War), Zachary Taylor (1846, 1847, and 1848 for the Mexican–American War), Lincoln Ellsworth (1928 and 1936 for polar exploration), and Hyman G. Rickover (1958 for the "Nuclear Navy" and 1982 for his entire career).

Process of awarding 

A difference between a Congressional Gold Medal and a Presidential Medal of Freedom is that the Presidential Medal of Freedom is personally awarded by the President of the United States, while Congressional Gold Medals are awarded by Acts of Congress. Congress may, however, authorize the President to present the award.

Per committee rules, legislation bestowing a Congressional Gold Medal upon a recipient must be co-sponsored by two-thirds of the membership of both the House of Representatives and the Senate before their respective committees—the House Committee on Financial Services and the Senate Committee on Banking, Housing, and Urban Affairs—will consider it.

A Congressional Gold Medal is designed by the United States Mint to specifically commemorate the person and achievement for which the medal is awarded. Medals are therefore different in appearance, and there is no standard design. Congressional Gold Medals are considered non-portable, meaning that they are not meant to be worn on a uniform or other clothing, but rather displayed.

In rare instances, miniature versions have been made or converted for wear on clothing, suspended from a ribbon. Examples are the Cardenas Medal for Frank H. Newcomb, the Jarvis Medal for David H. Jarvis, the Jeannette Medal for the men of the Jeannette expedition, the Byrd Antarctic Expedition Medal for the men of the First Byrd expedition of 1928–1930, and the NC-4 Medal for the men who completed the first transatlantic flight in May 1919. The latter was authorized in 1935 by  allowing the Secretary of the Navy to authorize—at his discretion—the wearing of commemorative or other special awards on Navy or Marine Corps uniforms, in military-sized form. 

Often, bronze versions of the medals are struck for sale by the U.S. Mint, and may be available in both larger and smaller sizes. In at least one case, the John Wayne Congressional Medal, private dealers bought large numbers of the bronze version. They were then gold plated and resold to the public for a significant profit.

The Congressional Gold Medal is distinct from the Medal of Honor, a military decoration for extreme bravery in action, and from the Congressional Space Medal of Honor, presented by NASA for extraordinary accomplishment in United States space exploration.

Recipients

See also
 Awards and decorations of the United States government
 Congressional Silver Medal
 Congressional Bronze Medal
 Thanks of Congress

References

Further reading
 Snowden, James Ross (1809–1878) (1861). A Description of the Medals of Washington; and of Other Objects of Interest in the Museum of the Mint. Illustrated, to Which Are Added Biographical Notices of the Directors of the Mint from 1792 to the year 1851. Philadelphia: J. B. Lippincott & Co.

External links 

 List of recipients
 Loubat, J. F. and Jacquemart, Jules, Illustrator, The Medallic History of the United States of America 1776–1876.

Congressional Gold Medal recipients
Awards established in 1776
Civil awards and decorations of the United States
Gold